Frane Vidović (born 18 April 1999 in Croatia) is a Croatian footballer.

References

External links
 

1999 births
Living people
Footballers from Rijeka
Association football defenders
Association football wingers
Croatian footballers
GNK Dinamo Zagreb II players
NK Rudeš players
NK Međimurje players
First Football League (Croatia) players
Croatian Football League players
Oberliga (football) players
Croatian expatriate footballers
Expatriate footballers in Germany
Croatian expatriate sportspeople in Germany